José Antonio Jaikel Aguilar (born 3 April 1966 in Alajuela) is a Costa Rican former football player who played most of his career with Deportivo Saprissa, during the 1980s and 1990s.

Club career
Nicknamed El Tanque, because of his strength and build, the striker won several national championships with Saprissa, as well as one CONCACAF Champions Cups. He also played with Herediano, before retiring at only 28 years of age.

International career
He was part of the Costa Rica national football team that played in the 1990 FIFA World Cup held in Italy, but didn't have any actual playing time.

His final international was a January 1994 friendly match against Norway.

International goals
Scores and results list Costa Rica's goal tally first.

Business career
After retiring as a player, he completed his studies industrial engineering at the Latin American University of Science and Technology. He is currently General Director for Central America at Gruma (Grupo Maseca), a food production company.

References

External links 

1966 births
Living people
People from Alajuela
Association football forwards
Costa Rican footballers
Costa Rica international footballers
1990 FIFA World Cup players
Deportivo Saprissa players
Costa Rican businesspeople